The 1929–30 season was Chelsea Football Club's twenty-first competitive season and sixth consecutive season in the Second Division. The club finished as runners-up in the Second Division, securing promotion to the First Division.

Table

References

External links
 1929–30 season at stamford-bridge.com

1929–30
English football clubs 1929–30 season